Derek or Derrick Watkins is the name of:

Derek Watkins (trumpeter) (1945–2013), British session musician
 Derek Watkins, dock workers shop steward and one of the Pentonville Five
Derrick Watkins (musician) (born 1974), American musician
Derrick Watkins (born 1983), Australian rugby league player